The 2004 UK & Ireland Greyhound Racing Year was the 79th year of greyhound racing in the United Kingdom and Ireland.

Summary
Irish racing was experiencing promising growth with increased prize money for competitions including the richest ever prize for a marathon event when the Corn Cuchulainn offered €50,000 for the winner at Harold's Cross.

The situation in Britain was not as simple after Richard Caborn, the Minister for Sport announced that it had been agreed that the bookmakers levy fund would increase to 0.5% in 2004, 0.55% in 2005 and 0.6% in 2006 and therefore doubling the sports income to £16 million within the three years. However the statement was incorrect because a 0.1% increase after three years would mean only a one sixth increase (16.6%). The promise turned out to be false because the levy fund actually decreased significantly over the next five years.

Droopys Scholes won the 2004 English Greyhound Derby and Like A Shot won the 2004 Irish Greyhound Derby. Charlie Lister won the Greyhound Trainer of the Year and Derby finalist, Arc, East Anglian Derby and Oxfordshire Gold Cup winner Fire Height Dan won the Greyhound of the Year.

Tracks
Coventry opened under new management after an 18-year absence.

Competitions
English Derby champion Farloe Verdict won the Scottish Greyhound Derby setting a new track record in the final. Brian Clemenson claimed his third successive Trainers Championship at Coventry. A brindle bitch called Roxholme Girl won the St Leger and the Gold Collar, the latter in a new track record time at the competition's new home of Belle Vue Stadium.

News
Trainer Tommy Foster retired from Wimbledon Stadium to concentrate on a small open race kennel and his son Jason joined Oxford Stadium.

Roll of honour

Principal UK finals

+ Track record

	

+ Track record

Principal Irish finals

References 

Greyhound racing in the United Kingdom
Greyhound racing in the Republic of Ireland
2004 in British sport
2004 in Irish sport